The Australia–United Kingdom free trade agreement was signed 17 December 2021. The broad terms of the agreement had been agreed six months earlier, following almost a year of negotiations. It was the first trade agreement signed by Britain since leaving the European Union that was negotiated completely anew.

Australia secured a seven-fold increase in tariff-free access to the UK market for its beef and lamb exports, to be phased in after ten years. In return, British citizens under 35 can get working holiday visas for three years instead of the previous two, and Australian employers do not need to show economic necessity to hire them. Observers took the agreement as a sign that the British government, in negotiating future trade agreements with nations with large agricultural sectors, will favour the interests of consumers over farmers.

In mid-2022, as both governments worked towards final ratification, the deal began coming in for heavy criticism on the British side. The National Farmers' Union expressed concern about the possibility that Australian exporters could flood the British market and drive down prices, as well as the lack of any protections for geographical indicators on foods such as Cornish clotted cream. Food-safety groups like the Pesticide Action Network were alarmed that the agreement had no provisions requiring Australian produce comply with stricter British standards. In November, as the Australian parliament's ratification vote neared, George Eustice, a Brexit supporter who had until September been in the Cabinet as Secretary of State for Environment, Food and Rural Affairs and negotiated parts of the deal, reiterated these concerns on the floor of the House of Commons when he denounced the deal, which the British Parliament did not get to vote on, as one-sided, blaming former Secretary of State for International Trade Liz Truss for forcing an agreement to be reached swiftly to make then-Prime Minister Boris Johnson's government look good; he also called for the lead UK negotiation, Crawford Falconer, to be replaced.

British defenders of the agreement noted in response that Eustice had had his chance to block the agreement while he was in the government and did not. They further said that it was unlikely that Australia would be fully exploiting the new quotas, since it did not even meet the current ones and found it more profitable to sell to large markets closer to it in Asia due to the time and distance involved in shipping to the UK. The British government also argued that it had maintained food-safety standards, with Australia agreeing to its high sanitary and phytosanitary (SPS) regulations for all food.

Background 
The United Kingdom voted to leave the European Union in the 2016 United Kingdom European Union membership referendum by 51.9 per cent of votes in favour to 48.1 per cent of votes against, in a decision referred to as Brexit. The United Kingdom subsequently left the European Union on 31 January 2020.

Polling conducted by YouGov from 7–8 September 2016, found that Australia was the country that Leave voters most wanted to sign a free trade agreement with, with 47 per cent ranking it as the top priority country.

In 2020, trade between the countries was valued at £13.9 billion. Australia accounts for 0.4 per cent of British exports and 1.3 per cent of imports.

Negotiations 
The United Kingdom and Australia started negotiations for a free trade deal on 17 June 2020. The broad terms of the agreement were agreed on 14 June 2021, following almost a year of negotiations.

On 15 June 2020, the Australian Government released its negotiating position. Two days later, on 17 June 2020, the UK Government also released its negotiation objectives, outlining what it would like to achieve in a free trade agreement.

Farmers in the United Kingdom expressed concern that prices would be undercut by cheaper Australian imports. The British government sought a 15-year cap on tariff-free imports to address these concerns. Polling conducted by Opinium Research found that 61 per cent of Britons prioritised protecting British farmers over signing new trade agreements, with 20 per cent prioritising signing new trade deals.

A year after negotiations began, the agreement was reached over dinner between Boris Johnson and Scott Morrison. The following day, the British government announced that an agreement had been reached in principle.

Provisions 
Under the terms of the agreement in principle, Australia would relax certain rules around working holiday visas for Britons under the age of 35.

Areas Covered in the FTA and Contention Points 
 Trade in Goods:
 Sanitary and Phytosanitary Measures (SPS):
 Customs and Trade Facilitation
 Rules of Origin
 Technical Barriers to Trade (TBT)
 Good Regulatory Practices
 Transparency, Publication, and Administrative Measures
 Trade in Services, Including Telecommunications and Financial Services
Mobility
 Digital Trade in Goods and Services and Cross-Border Data Flows
 Investment
 Intellectual Property
 Procedural Fairness for Pharmaceuticals and Medical Devices
 State-Owned and Controlled Enterprises (SOEs)
 Subsidies
 Competition Policy
 Labor
 Environment
 Anti-corruption
 Trade Remedies
 Settlement
 General Provisions

Significance 

On 15 June 2021, the British Secretary of State for International Trade and President of the Board of Trade, Liz Truss, said that the agreement "paved the way" for the United Kingdom to become a member of the Comprehensive and Progressive Agreement for Trans-Pacific Partnership (CPTPP). The United Kingdom formally applied to join the CPTPPP in February 2021 and began membership negotiations on 2 June 2021.

British government estimates suggest that an agreement would grow the British economy by £500 million over the course of 15 years, equivalent to a 0.02 per cent increase in GDP.

The Australian National Farmers' Federation welcomed the deal as an opportunity for increased Australian agricultural exports to the United Kingdom.

On 11 May 2022, the UK Government introduced a Trade Bill which will help ratify and bring into force the UK-Australia and UK-New Zealand Free Trade Agreements (FTAs) that were signed in December and February respectively.

The Australian Government has confirmed it is "confident" the UK-Australia Free Trade Agreement will be ready to be put into action by year's end with thousands more young people set to be eligible for a working visa. The extended negotiation process between the two countries finally drew to an end late last year when the then-Johnson and Morrison governments signed the landmark deal.

On 17 November 2022, the Australian Government Joint Standing Committee on Treaties (JSCOT) handed down its report on the Australia–United Kingdom Free Trade Agreement (A-UKFTA). The committee made two recommendations:

The Committee recommends the Australian Government implements the recommendations of Report 193: Strengthening the Trade Agreement and Treaty Making Process in Australia, particularly in relation to greater consultation and transparency during the negotiating process, and providing independent modelling and analysis of trade agreements.
The Committee supports the Free Trade Agreement between Australia and the United Kingdom of Great Britain and Northern Ireland and recommends that binding treaty action be taken. Subsequently, on 22 November 2022, the treaty passed both Houses of Parliament.

A-UKFTA will enter-into-force after Australia and the UK confirm with each other in writing that they have completed their respective domestic requirements.
In a step towards this, the Australian Parliament passed the required legislation to implement the agreement in late November this year. The UK Government is still in the process of enacting enabling legislation required as part of its own ratification process. The Australian Minister for Trade and Tourism has recently announced he will encourage the UK to finalise their domestic requirements so that the A-UK FTA can enter into force in early 2023.

Response in Australia

The Lowy Institute was unstinting in its praise for the agreement. "It is hard to overstate this achievement by the Australian negotiating team", wrote Dmitry Grozoubinski, a commentator on its blog. While most often the ecstatic language of news releases announcing trade deals hid the lack of real accomplishments, "[n]ot this time. This deal does what it says on the tin."

"Remarkably, it is not clear what UK negotiators managed to extract in reciprocal concessions", Grozoubinski continued, foreshadowing a theme that would later be sounded in British criticism of the deal. "Sure Australia has agreed to eliminate its own tariffs, but that is somewhat like landlocked Switzerland offering to eliminate its navy. Unlike the UK, which has some formidable tariff walls around agriculture, Australia's tariffs are incredibly low and their elimination is unlikely to change anyone's commercial calculus."

Criticism in UK

In 2022, as the British government moved towards implementing the deal, agricultural interests were criticising it. Early in the year the UK chapter of the Pesticide Action Network (PAN) issued Toxic Trade, a report expressing concern that the agreement might weaken British restrictions on pesticide use by permitting the import of Australian crops grown under laxer standards—for example, Britain permits farmers to use just four organophosphates against the thirty-three allowed in Australia. It feared this might set a precedent for Britain making similar concessions in negotiating trade deals with other large countries that export produce in quantity such as the United States, India and Brazil.

A June report on the proposed deal by the House of Lords's International Agreements Committee generally accepted it, but expressed concern that the government's haste to conclude it might have come at the expense of whatever negotiating leverage it had. The committee noted that the agreement failed to offer any protection to certain geographically-indicated British foods, such as Cornish clotted cream and Scotch whisky, allowing any Australian producer to use them for foods exported to Britain. It also expressed concern about the pesticide issue and other environmental concerns such as food grown on deforested land, and chastised the government for insufficient consultation with its devolved parliaments. "The Government should take disappointment from UK stakeholders seriously" it wrote. Compassion in World Farming, along with the Royal Society for the Prevention of Cruelty to Animals, Which? and several other organisations, also put out a report expressing concern about the government compromising on animal welfare standards as well as food safety.

The following month the House of Commons' International Trade Committee, a cross-party group, joined the criticism. Scottish National Party MP Angus MacNeil, its chair, not only repeated the concerns expressed by PAN and the Lords' committee but said the treaty would bring minimal economic gain in return for those concessions. Since by its own calculations it would increase Britain's GDP 0.08 per cent, "[t]he government must level with the public—this trade deal will not have the transformative effects ministers would like to claim", he said. Consumers might benefit, the committee allowed, but only in very small ways such as slightly lower prices on Australian wine.

Specifically, the National Farmers' Union (NFU), was quoted in the report as to the competitive imbalance between British and Australian agriculture. "British farmers are being asked to go toe-to-toe with some of the most cost-effective food producers in the world.", the NFU said. "But there is scant evidence that the government has the vision to create the conditions to allow our farmers to compete ... we do believe that deals must be balanced in respect of offering reciprocal benefit." The NFU had also lobbied heavily, but futilely, for beef and lamb quotas in the agreement to be based on carcass weight equivalent.

In November, George Eustice, who up until two months before had been Secretary of State for Environment, Food and Rural Affairs and thus involved in the negotiations, vociferously criticised the treaty in Parliament as "not actually a very good deal for the UK." He faulted Truss, who had dismissed him from his post at the beginning of her brief tenure as Prime Minister and was at the time of the negotiations Secretary of State for International Trade, for putting British negotiators "on the back foot" with her insistence that a deal be concluded before the end of the 2021 G7 summit in Cornwall, where Australian prime minister Scott Morrison was a guest and the two could announce the deal after dinner on the last night. He praised some aspects of the deal that his department had been the primary negotiator on, such as the phasing in of reduced agricultural tariffs over a 10-15 year period and recognition of British sovereignty in SPS standards, but "overall the truth of the matter is that the UK gave away far too much for far too little in return."

Eustice was particularly critical of one other person involved, Crawford Falconer, the New Zealand-born interim permanent secretary of the Department of International Trade (DIT): "His approach always was to internalise Australian demands, often when they were against UK interests, his advice was invariably to retreat and make fresh concessions and all the while he resented people who understood technical issues greater than he did." Eustice said Falconer should be replaced with "somebody who understands British interests better than I think he's been able to."

Other observers joined Eustice in another criticism: the government's failure to keep a promise to allow Parliament to debate the treaty. They contrasted that with Australia's final adoption of the treaty in late November following a full debate in both houses of its Parliament. But although both Truss and her predecessor, Boris Johnson, had promised the same on their end, Rishi Sunak, Truss's successor, who had campaigned for the Conservative Party leadership against Truss in part by criticizing the agreement although he ruled out renegotiating it, never put the deal up for a vote. "Never again must our democracy be bypassed," tweeted NFU president Minette Batters, in response to Australian Prime Minister Anthony Albanese posting a picture of himself and Sunak shaking hands to announce the former's Parliament passing the deal. "[E]very FTA must be scrutinised by Parliament."

An economist with the Agriculture and Trade Commission (ATC), Catherine McBride, took the opposite tack in her criticism, arguing that the deal was too protective of British farmers, in the way it phased in the tariff reductions. The hard truth, she wrote in the Daily Express, was that the UK had long since passed the point where its farmers could grow enough food to feed the entire population, and needed imports of many farm products, particularly beef and lamb. Dairy farmers should not, McBride said, have to wait six years for tariff-free access to the Australian market so their cattle- and lamb-raising counterparts could be insulated from corresponding competition for fifteen. "Protecting a bad business model (UK grazing) to the detriment of a good business (UK dairy farming) is economic madness", she wrote. "But, that is how protectionism usually plays out."

Response

In response to these criticisms, government spokespeople reiterated that the agreement would add to the British economy, that it would not compromise on food safety standards, and that the ATC had concluded that it had not. On the issue of geographical indications, they pointed out that Australia did not have any such protections for agricultural products, foodstuffs or spirits. "Should they introduce such a scheme we have agreed to review our agreement with Australia to ensure the UK's finest products are protected", they said. "This is the strongest commitment that Australia has made towards setting up a GI scheme in any of its trade deals."

Eustice's remarks drew a sharper response. A DIT source reminded The Guardian that Eustice had been in the Cabinet when the deal was approved there. "If the deal was as bad as he claims, he would never have approved it." Others felt it was an overreach for Eustice to so harshly criticise Falconer to the point of calling on him to be fired, since as a civil servant Falconer by convention cannot respond. "I hope [Eustice] will see his way to apologising for it because it was completely unfair," said one government consultant, while Ben Ramanasaukas, a former advisor to Truss, called the former DEFRA secretary's remarks "mean-spirited and wrong".

But while Ramanasaukas agreed with Eustice and other critics that setting a deadline for the deal was a bad idea, he disagreed with other elements of their objections. "They see it as a zero-sum game", he said. "They see imports as a bad thing." By contrast, he argued they were "fantastic for obvious reasons: lower prices for consumers and other businesses, more competition, thriving innovation."

Others said it was important to place the deal in its full context. "Given the importance of agricultural exports to both Australia and New Zealand," said one former British trade negotiator, "it's hard to see how those deals would have happened if the UK hadn't made market access commitments in those areas." Britain would also need both countries' support for its application to join the Comprehensive and Progressive Agreement for Trans-Pacific Partnership, as they are already full members. Ed Conway, economics and data editor at Sky News, among others, noted when the deal was reached that the distance between the two countries was more of a constraint on trade than any tariffs or restrictions, especially since Australia had larger markets to sell to much closer at hand. Even at present, he said, Australian beef and lamb exports to the UK did not come anywhere near the quotas set during the EU era. He still cautioned that the sevenfold increase in the quotas would come much more abruptly than the government had represented it as.

Further, Conway pointed out, Australia had prior to Britain's EU accession been a much larger trading partner. In the mid-1950s, roughly 12.5 per cent of all British exports went to Australia, an amount that began falling before accession, to 1.6 per cent sixty years later. Conway saw the deal's terms as indicating that the UK would, in negotiating future trade deals with large agricultural nations, be moving away from EU-legacy protections for its farmers and toward the interests of consumers.

However, Nick von Westenholtz, director of trade for the NFU, pointed to caveats those arguments did not take into account. Primarily, he noted, they were based on the assumption that Australia's current trading relationships would remain the same for some time to come. If, he posited, China decided to drastically limit Australian meat imports for some reason, Australian producers might decide to take the full advantage allowed them of the British market in order to compensate, and Britain would not be able to do much about that. "The UK government has reserved itself almost no recourse to managing imports if they start proving harmful to UK farm livelihoods."

In Australia, Grubouzinski similarly noted that the British government's selling points for the agreement contradicted themselves. "To farmers and their representatives, apoplectic about this deal, it has argued that Australian produce is unlikely to flood into the UK market, citing existing trading patterns and strong demand closer to home." Yet, "[c]onversely, in media commentary, press releases, and speaking to its more libertarian members the UK government primarily emphasised the benefits to consumers of cheaper or at least more plentiful access to Australian products, from Tim Tam biscuits to steaks." But few consumers were likely to see those benefits, Grubouzinski noted, unless Australian products actually were to flood British markets at levels that would force prices down to the point of adversely affecting British farmers and other producers.

See also 

 List of bilateral free-trade agreements
Trade agreements of the United Kingdom
Australia–United Kingdom relations

Notes

References

External links 

 Summary of the Australian Government negotiating aims from the Department of Foreign Affairs and Trade
 The British Government's strategic approach to negotiations from the Department for International Trade
Press conference announcing the agreement in principle on 15 June from ABC News on YouTube
 FTA Statement from the Department of Foreign Affairs and Trade 
 FTA Statement from the Department for International Trade

2021 in Australia
2021 in the United Kingdom
Free trade agreements of Australia
Free trade agreements of the United Kingdom
Australia and the Commonwealth of Nations
United Kingdom and the Commonwealth of Nations
Australia–United Kingdom relations
Morrison Government
2021 in international relations